Anna Führing (1866–1929) was a German actress. She is, however, more famous as the model for the Germania stamp of the Reichspost.

Life and career
Anna Führing was born in Hamburg on 6 March 1866, as the daughter of the theatre and restaurant owner Carl Führing. In Berlin she received her education in acting. Frequently she represented on stage the figure of Germania, as for instance at a festival in Düsseldorf in 1891 when emperor Wilhelm II was in attendance. In 1892, when the Theater am Schiffbauerdamm in Berlin was inaugurated, Führing played the role of Iphigenie. With the rise of the silent films, Führing took on roles in the new medium.

Führing was the model for engraver  who designed the Germania series of definitive stamps that were first issued in 1900 and continued in use for 22 years. She is depicted wearing an octagonal imperial crown, holding a sword and an olive branch] The art nouveau design was personally chosen by the emperor Wilhelm II.

In 1899, she married Ferdinand von Strantz, the Director of the Hofoper of Berlin and 45 years her senior. She henceforth carried the title Baronin Anna von Strantz-Führing; the couple had one daughter. Führing died in Berlin on 2 November 1929.

Filmography
Hausdame aus bester Familie gesucht (1915, as Anna von Strantz-Führing)
Ein Held des Unterseebootes (1915, as Anna von Strantz-Führing)
Nacht und Morgen (1916)
 The Wonderful Adventure (1924)
Eine kleine Freundin braucht ein jeder Mann (1927)
Ossi hat die Hosen an (1928, as Baronin Strantz-Führing)

References

Literature

External links 

 
 
 Arbeitsgemeinschaft Germania Briefmarken

1866 births
1929 deaths
German film actresses
German stage actresses
Actresses from Hamburg
20th-century German actresses
19th-century German actresses